Papakowhai Homestead is a historic building in Porirua, New Zealand.

The homestead has great regional significance as it dates to the first decades of organised Pakeha settlement in the Porirua area. It is believed that the back portion of the house dates from c.1848 when the Bowler family farmed the area.

Papakowhai Homestead was listed by the New Zealand Historic Places Trust (since renamed to Heritage New Zealand) as a Category I historic place in 1986.

References 

Houses in New Zealand
1840s architecture in New Zealand
1880s architecture in New Zealand
Heritage New Zealand Category 1 historic places in the Wellington Region
Buildings and structures in Porirua